Richard Vaux (December 19, 1816 – March 22, 1895) was an American politician. He was mayor of Philadelphia and a member of the U.S. House of Representatives from Pennsylvania.

Early life and education
Richard Vaux was born in Philadelphia, Pennsylvania, December 19, 1816. The son of the lawyer philanthropist Roberts Vaux, he was educated by private tutors at the Friends Select School in Philadelphia and Bolmar's French School in West Chester, Pennsylvania.  After studying law, Richard Vaux was admitted to the Pennsylvania bar in Philadelphia on April 15, 1837, about a year after his father's early death. Vaux traveled to London with government dispatches and remained for a year to serve as secretary of legation under Andrew Stevenson, United States Minister to Great Britain.

Vaux returned to Philadelphia in 1839 and was elected a member of the Pennsylvania State House of Representatives, then a delegate to the Democratic State convention in 1840.  Vaux began the private practice of law in Philadelphia in 1840, around the time of his marriage as mentioned below. Vaux served as recorder of deeds of Philadelphia from 1842 to 1849, although the position lacked any salary, and in 1845 published the Recorders' Decisions which became well known (as was his never having been reversed by a higher court). The Supreme Court of Pennsylvania appointed Vaux Inspector of the State Penitentiary for the Eastern District of Pennsylvania in 1842, and he served as secretary and later as president of the board of inspectors until his death. He was elected as a member of the American Philosophical Society in 1884.

Mayoral campaigns

An unsuccessful candidate for mayor of Philadelphia in 1842, 1846, and 1854 as a Democrat opposing Whig candidates, Vaux was elected mayor in 1856. He was subsequently defeated for reelection in 1858 by Alexander Henry.

Vaux also served as a member of the Board of City Trusts 1859–1866, and its president 1863–1865.

Congress
Vaux was elected in 1890 as a Democrat to the 51st Congress to fill the vacancy left by the death of Samuel J. Randall and served from May 20, 1890, to March 3, 1891, having lost his bid for reelection in 1890.

Personal life
Deeply involved with the Masonic fraternity since the age of 26, Vaux served as Grand Master of the Grand Lodge of Pennsylvania in 1868.  He thus laid the cornerstone of the iconic Masonic Temple of Philadelphia which remains the headquarters for Freemasonry in the state, symbolically tapping it into place with the same gavel George Washington had used during the Masonic cornerstone ceremony for the United States Capitol building.

Vaux married on March 12, 1840, Mary Morris, daughter of Jacob Shoemaker and Sarah Morris Waln. Richard and Mary Vaux had six children, of whom Jacob Waln Vaux was the fifth.

Vaux died on March 22, 1895, in Philadelphia and was interred in Laurel Hill Cemetery.

References

1816 births
1895 deaths
Politicians from Philadelphia
Mayors of Philadelphia
Democratic Party members of the Pennsylvania House of Representatives
Democratic Party members of the United States House of Representatives from Pennsylvania
Members of the Philadelphia Club
Burials at Laurel Hill Cemetery (Philadelphia)
19th-century American politicians
Members of the American Philosophical Society